Djelfa district is an Algerian administrative district in the Djelfa province.  Its capital is town of Djelfa .

Communes 
The district is composed of only one commune: Djelfa.

References 

Districts of Tizi Ouzou Province
Districts of Djelfa Province